The most recent record label to use the name Rex Records was started in 2001 as an off-shot of XL Recordings. Overall, it was an experiment releasing demo recordings from more left field artists. The label was the original home of Australian artists The Avalanches and The Vines, and has also released the single Seventeen Years by Ratatat.

See also
 List of record labels
 Rex Records (disambiguation)

References

British record labels
Record labels established in 2001
Alternative rock record labels